Marius George Curteanu is a Romanian dressage rider and trainer. In 1984 he was selected for the Romanian National Equestrian Team. As a member of national team, he participated in international dressage competitions in Italy, Germany, Greece, Hungary, Poland, Turkey and Bulgaria, winning many prizes and medals. He has been riding over 35 years and his experience covers a wide range of equestrian work (riding, coaching, clinics) and a wide range of horses up to Grand Prix level in dressage.

Professional experience 
1985 - 1995: Every year National Dressage Champion.
1988: Romanian Referee License in Dressage and Show Jumping.
1991: Awarded "Master of Sports" title by officials from Romania.
1992: Romanian Trainers License in Dressage.
1996-2001:Trainer and dressage rider in Kaiserhof, Legelshurst, Germany.
2013: Equestrian Passport - IGEQ (International Group for Equestrian Qualification)

In Germany he won dressage tests at L, M and S Level competitions and he trained students from A to S level.
1999:  Vice-Champion Sud-Baden-Wurttemberg on horse Axon.
2000: the 8th place in the Baden-Wurttemberg, Grand Prix, on horse Le Beau.

Student prepared by Marius won the titles of:
 "Junior Champion" in 1999
 "Young Rider Vice-Champion" in 2000
 "Young Rider Champion" in 2001, in Sud-Baden—Wurttemberg, all on horse Furst Charly.

To polish his dressage skills he was trained by the world famous dressage trainer George Theodorescu.

In 2002, returned to Romania, he trained private horses and riders, from novice to FEI levels. One of his students was the 4th in Novice at the Romanian FEI World Dressage Challenge on horse Michelle. In 2003, at Romanian FEI World Dressage Challenge, his student was the 1st in Advanced Level on horse Michelle, and the 1st in Prix St. Georges on horse Caramelle, qualifying her for the Finals in Hagen, Germany.  Between 2007–2008, with P1 visa, Marius was in USA to train and give clinics in Florida and Texas.

Achievements
 1985–1995 every year, national dressage champion, on different horses
 1989 - winner of the Balkan Championship with team, on horse Luxor
 1993 - winner of the Balkan Championship with team and individual silver medal, on horse Fram
 1994 - balkan vice-champion with team, and individual bronze medal, on horse Sorg
 1995 - double balkan champion (team and individual), on horse Sorg
 2003 - FEI World Dressage Challenge winner in Group IV at novice level on horse Weltano and 2nd in Prix St. Georges on horse Maestoso
After 2 ½ years of extensive training to FEI level, horse Maestoso was purchased for importation to the United States

Recognition
Marius' work and experience received media attention and coverage in Romania, Germany and the United States. Many articles reflected his personal and his students' work in dressage and classical training.

References

http://www.hippomundo.com/competitions/rider/8044
http://www.hippomundo.be/competitions/results/5743
Turkish gazette
CLAUDIA KAISER MIT GOLDENEM REITABZEICHEN GEEHRT PD 07/2003

Romanian male equestrians
Dressage trainers
1963 births
Living people